Robert McKenzie Carlin (24 January 1871 – 10 March 1950) was an English cricketer who played first-class cricket  for Derbyshire between 1905 and 1908. He also played football for Sheffield United. Carlin died at Conisbrough, Yorkshire at the age of 79.

Cricket career

Carlin was born at Eastwood, Nottinghamshire. He made his debut for Derbyshire in the 1905 season in July against Marylebone Cricket Club (MCC) when he took two wickets, but did not play for the club again until the 1907 season. He played ten matches in that year, and four in the 1908 season.

Carlin was a right-hand batsman and played 28 innings in 15 first-class matches with an average of 11.33 and a top score of 37. He was a right-arm medium pace bowler and took five first-class wickets at an average of 41.60 and with a best performance of 2 for 53.

Football career

Alongside cricket Carlin played football as a goalkeeper, starting as a junior with Heanor Town before playing for Dronfield and professionally with Sheffield United, later playing for both South Kirkby and Mexborough Athletic.

References

1871 births
1950 deaths
English cricketers
Derbyshire cricketers
English footballers
South Kirkby Colliery F.C. players
Sheffield United F.C. players
Cricketers from Yorkshire
Footballers from Yorkshire
Association football goalkeepers